Svetlana Antonovska (April 6, 1952 – October 7, 2016) was a Macedonian statistician. She headed the State Statistical Office of the Republic of Macedonia from its founding in 1991 until 2001, brought the office into communication with several major international statistical organizations, and founded the first census of the republic.

References

1952 births
2016 deaths
Macedonian women in politics
Macedonian sociologists
Macedonian women scientists
Women sociologists
Women statisticians
Demographers
Macedonian statisticians